The Women's 100 metre backstroke S12 swimming event at the 2004 Summer Paralympics was competed on 25 September. It was won by Zhu Hong Yan, representing .

Final round

25 Sept. 2004, evening session

References

W
2004 in women's swimming